The Skraup synthesis is a chemical reaction used to synthesize quinolines. It is named after the Czech chemist Zdenko Hans Skraup (1850-1910). In the archetypal Skraup reaction, aniline is heated with sulfuric acid, glycerol, and an oxidizing agent such as nitrobenzene to yield quinoline.

In this example, nitrobenzene serves as both the solvent and the oxidizing agent.  The reaction, which otherwise has a reputation for being violent, is typically conducted in the presence of ferrous sulfate. Arsenic acid may be used instead of nitrobenzene and the former is better since the reaction is less violent.

See also
 Bischler-Napieralski reaction
 Doebner-Miller reaction

References

Condensation reactions
Quinoline forming reactions
Name reactions